Edward David Esser (born 20 June 1957) is an English footballer who played as a midfielder in the Football League in the 1970s and 1980s.

He started as an apprentice with Everton in 1975-76 but did not play a league game for them and moved to Rochdale where he made 180 league appearances. After Rochdale he joined Cypriot club APOEL, and went on to play for Karlskrona, Altrincham, Hyde United, Witton Albion (three spells), Northwich Victoria, Macclesfield Town, Stalybridge Celtic, Winsford United and Ashton United.

References

External links
 Everton squad photo

Living people
1957 births
People from Altrincham
English footballers
Association football midfielders
Everton F.C. players
Rochdale A.F.C. players
APOEL FC players
FK Karlskrona players
Altrincham F.C. players
Hyde United F.C. players
Witton Albion F.C. players
Northwich Victoria F.C. players
Macclesfield Town F.C. players
Stalybridge Celtic F.C. players
Winsford United F.C. players
Ashton United F.C. players
English Football League players
Cypriot First Division players
National League (English football) players
Northern Premier League players
English expatriate footballers
Expatriate footballers in Cyprus
Expatriate footballers in Sweden